Seyedeh Elham Hosseini or Elham Hosseini (born 16 November 1988) is an Iranian weightlifter. She won 3 gold medals in the 2022 Asian Weightlifting Championships event at the 81 kg, held in Manama, Bahrain.

She is the first Iranian women who won Gold medal in Asian Weightlifting Championships ever.

She is the record holder of Iranian women's weightlifting in 76 and 81 kg categories.video with subtitles

Major results

References

External links 
 
 
 Profile at Sports Reference
 video of her 3 gold medals won in 2022 Asian Weightlifting Championships (2 record of Iran) 

Living people
1988 births
People from Dorud
Iranian female weightlifters
Islamic Solidarity Games competitors for Iran
Islamic Solidarity Games medalists in weightlifting
20th-century Iranian women
21st-century Iranian women